Ovarian diseases refer to diseases or disorders of the ovary.

These can be classified as endocrine disorders or as a disorders of the reproductive system.

If the egg fails to release from the follicle in the ovary an ovarian cyst may form. Small ovarian cysts are common in healthy women. Some women have more follicles than usual (polycystic ovary syndrome), which inhibits the follicles to grow normally and this will cause cycle irregularities.

Various types of ovarian diseases exist. Some of the ovarian diseases or disorders include: endometriosis, ovarian cysts, ovarian epithelial cancer, ovarian germ cell tumors, ovarian low malignant potential tumors, and polycystic ovary syndrome (PCOS).

Endometriosis 
Endometriosis is a condition in which tissues lining the uterus (endometrial stroma and gland) grows abnormally beyond the uterus that may become quite painful. In simpler terms, it means that the tissue lining the uterus develops in different parts outside of it. It can be either at ovary, fallopian tubes, or peritoneal spaces.

There is no single cause of endometriosis.

Symptoms:

Menstrual cramps, heavy menstrual bleeding, bowel or urinary problems, nausea, vomiting, blood with stools, painful intercourse, fatigues, spotting or bleeding between periods.

Treatment:

 Surgery at extreme situations
 Hormonal treatments using birth controls.
 Healthier lifestyle.

Ovarian cysts 

It is common for many women to develop a cyst in their lifetime. At times, these can go unnoticed without pain or visible symptoms. A cyst may develop in either of the ovaries that are responsible for producing hormones and carrying eggs in the bodies of women. Ovarian cysts can be of various types like dermoid cysts, endometrioma cysts and the functional cyst being the most common one 

Symptoms:

 Abdominal bloating or swelling.
 Painful bowel movement.
 Pelvic pain before or after the menstrual cycle.
 Painful intercourse.
 Pain in the lower back or thighs.
 Breast tenderness.
 Nausea and vomiting.
 Fever.
 Rapid breathing.
 Faintness or dizziness.
 Sharp pelvic pain.

Treatment:

 Taking of oral contraceptives or birth control pills as prescribed by the doctor.
 Laparoscopy: Surgery to remove the cyst.
 Hysterectomy in case the cyst is cancerous.

Ovarian epithelial cancer 
It is one of the common ovarian cancers that affect women worldwide. It develops outside the ovaries and ultimately spreads outside and can affect other organs.

Causes:

It may happen if there is a family medical history of breast cancer, colon cancer, rectal cancer or uterine cancer, or Lynch syndrome. If someone is under Estrogen Replacement Therapy for a long time. Smoking habits may also lead to the same. 

Treatment:

 Surgery to remove the uterus.
 Chemotherapy.

Ovarian germ cell tumors 
Ovarian germ cell tumors are common among teenagers and young women. It is a growth in the ovaries. 

Causes:

Though the exact causes are not known, it may happen owing to certain birth defects affecting the genitals, nervous system or the urinary tract. There may be genetic conditions affecting the sex chromosomes that result in these kind of tumors as well.

Symptoms

 Belly swelling.
 Pain or pressure in the belly.
 Swollen abdomen.
 Vaginal bleeding after menopause.

Treatment:

 Surgery to remove the tumor, or the Fallopian tubes or one or more ovaries.
 Hysterectomy.
 Chemotherapy in case the tumor is cancerous.
 Radiation therapy to prevent the cancerous cells from developing.

Ovarian low malignant potential tumors 
The tumor forms in the ovaries and gradually spreads to the outside of ovary. This mostly affects younger women and also hinders the reproductive system.

Causes:

Causes are debatable and these may occur to both pregnant women and women who do not opt for pregnancy

Symptoms:

 Abdominal pain or swelling.
 Bowel problems or constipation.

Treatment:

Depending on the size of the tumor, choice of pregnancy, the spreading of the tumor, age and choices, removing the affected ovary is the most common treatment. In rare situations, the tumor is taken out of the ovary. Also, hysterectomy can be an option.

Polycystic ovary syndrome

This is a hormonal imbalance, where androgens (also called male hormones) are elevated.

The increased level of androgens may result in irregular menstrual cycle and diabetes and heart problem in the long run. It also affects the body in various ways like problem getting pregnant, sleep apnea, depression and anxiety, can enhance the risk of endometrial cancer.

Symptoms:

 Irregular periods.
 Heavy bleeding during periods.
 Excess hair growth on face and other parts of the body like chest, back, belly.
 Acne.
 Weight gain.
 Darkening of skin.
 Headaches.

Treatment:

 Oral contraceptives to promote regular periods
 Healthier lifestyle.

Other conditions include:
 Ovarian cancer
 Luteoma
 Hypogonadism
 Hyperthecosis

References

External links 

Noninflammatory disorders of female genital tract